The Mons family is a Dutch family associated with several affairs that shocked the court of Peter I of Russia in 1704 and 1724.

 Anna Mons (1672 – 1714)
 Willem Mons (1688 – 1724)
 Natalia Lopukhina (1699 – 1763)

Russian noble families
Dutch families